An Caisteal may refer to several places in Scotland:

An Caisteal, a Scottish mountain in the Stirling Council area
An Caisteal (Coll), a Scottish hillfort on the island of Coll
An Caisteal, the highest peak of Ben Loyal in Sutherland